The Battle of Warburg was a battle fought on 31 July 1760 during the Seven Years' War.  The battle was a victory for the Hanoverians and the British against a slightly larger French army. The victory meant the Anglo-German allies had successfully defended Westphalia from the French by preventing a crossing of the Diemel River, but were forced to abandon the allied state of Hesse-Kassel to the south. The fortress of Kassel ultimately fell, and would remain in French hands until the final months of the war, when it was finally recaptured by the Anglo-German allies in late 1762.

The British general, John Manners, Marquess of Granby, became famous in the battle for charging at the head of the British cavalry and losing his hat and wig during the charge. The French lost 1500 men, killed and wounded, around 2,000 prisoners and ten pieces of artillery.

References

Bibliography 
 Chenevix-Trench, Charles, A History of Horsemanship, (Doubleday & Co, 1970)
 Skrine, Francis, Fontenoy and Great Britain's share in the War of the Austrian Succession 1741–1748 (William Blackwood, Edinburgh, 1906)
 Williams, Basil, The Whig Supremacy (Oxford History of England Series, OUP, 1960)

External links
 Battle of Warburg

Battle of Warburg
Battles of the Seven Years' War
Battles involving France
Battles involving Great Britain
Battles involving Hesse-Kassel
1760 in the Holy Roman Empire
Battles in North Rhine-Westphalia